Dividing Lines is the twelfth studio album by progressive metal band Threshold, released on 18 November 2022.

Track listing

Personnel 
Threshold

 Glynn Morgan – vocals
 Karl Groom – guitars, production, mixing, mastering 
 Richard West – keyboards, production
 Steve Anderson – bass
 Johanne James – drums 

Production

 Masiha Fattahi – cover image
 Robert Burress – band photography
 Eightspace – sleeve design

Charts

References

2022 albums
Nuclear Blast albums
Threshold (band) albums